Deepa Jayakumar (born 10 November 1974), also known as J. Deepa, is a former politician and journalist.

Personal life
Deepa was born on 10 November 1974 to Jayakumar (elder brother of J. Jayalalithaa, former Chief Minister of Tamil Nadu) and Vijayalakshmi.  She was schooled in Adharsh Vidyalaya, Chennai. She graduated with a bachelor's degree in English literature from the University of Madras. She pursued her master's degree in journalism and mass communication in Madurai Kamarajar University. Later, she worked as a sub-editor in the New Indian Express and then went to the UK in 2010. She completed an M.A. in International Journalism at Cardiff university, in Wales.

Deepa has a brother Deepak Jayakumar. Deepa's family resided in Veda Nilayam, Poes Garden together with J. Jayalalithaa till 1978. 

On 10 November 2022, Deepa announced that she gave birth to her girl child on 31 October 2022.

Career 
In front of Deepa's house, AIADMK volunteers urged her to become AIADMK general secretary, Chief Minister of Tamil Nadu and requested her to fill the place of her aunt. On 24 February 2017, on the occasion of Selvi. Jayalalithaa's birthday, she launched MGR Amma Deepa Peravai. She changed her federation name to AIADMK J. Deepa wing, a team of AIADMK. Husband K. Madhavan supports her with the federation, and is its Deputy General Secretary.

On 12 April 2017, she filed her nomination for R.K Nagar by-poll as an MAD Peravai candidate. The by-poll was later cancelled. She filed again for the 21 December 2017 R. K Nagar by-election. Her nomination was rejected by the returning officer. Sources said Deepa's affidavit was not in order and that she had not filled all the columns, specifically the one seeking information on the value of her properties.

In March 2019, she said that her federation would contest alone for all 40 seats in Tamil Nadu. Later, she decided to tie-up with the AIADMK, saying her outfit belonged to the ruling party and even her followers were in favour of the alliance.

On 30 July 2019, she announced that she was quitting politics, for lack of support, threats, abuses, health issues and peace of mind. She officially dissolved the party on the same date and advised no one to contact her further.

References 

1974 births
Living people
Women in Tamil Nadu politics
21st-century Indian women politicians
21st-century Indian politicians